Shooting at the 2011 Pacific Games was held on 30 August to 1 September 2011 in Nouméa, New Caledonia.

Medal summary

Medal table

Shotgun results

References

Shooting at the 2011 Pacific Games

2011 Pacific Games
2011
Pacific Games